Brenda Halloran is a former mayor of Waterloo, Ontario. She was first elected in the 2006 municipal election, defeating incumbent mayor Herb Epp and former mayor Brian Turnbull.  She was re-elected in 2010.

Personal

Halloran was born in Hamilton, Ontario to James 'Jim' (July 6, 1929 - April 21, 2005) and Doreen Halloran, as the first of three children. Her two younger brothers Michael and Jeffrey are an engineer and a small business owner respectively. The family settled in Waterloo in 1964, three years after the youngest son, Jeffrey, was born. Halloran graduated from Waterloo Collegiate Institute, then studied nursing at Conestoga College (RN 1976)

Prior to her election to the mayoralty, Halloran worked as a dispute resolution advisor and mediator for the Canada Revenue Agency from 1990 to 2006. Halloran returned to Waterloo in 1990 after living in Toronto and Florida during her earlier nursing career.<
Halloran also took courses at Ryerson University and obtained a certificate in conflict resolution from Conrad Grebel College.

References

External links
 Brenda Halloran (copy archived August 2008)

Conestoga College alumni
Living people
Mayors of Waterloo, Ontario
Politicians from Hamilton, Ontario
Politicians from Toronto
Women mayors of places in Ontario
Year of birth missing (living people)